A partial solar eclipse occurred on April 8, 1902. A solar eclipse occurs when the Moon passes between Earth and the Sun, thereby totally or partly obscuring the image of the Sun for a viewer on Earth. A partial solar eclipse occurs in the polar regions of the Earth when the center of the Moon's shadow misses the Earth. This was the 76th and final event from Solar Saros 108.

Related eclipses

Solar eclipses 1902–1907

Metonic series

Notes

References

External links 

1902 4 8
1902 in science
1902 4 8
April 1902 events